Mandevilla sagittarii, synonym Mandevilla dodsonii, is a species of flowering plant in the family Apocynaceae, native to Panama, Colombia, and Ecuador. It was first described by Robert Everard Woodson in 1932.

Conservation
Mandevilla dodsonii was assessed as "endangered" in the 2003 IUCN Red List, where it is said to be native only to Ecuador. , M. dodsonii was regarded as a synonym of Mandevilla sagittarii, which has a wider distribution.

References

sagittarii
Flora of Colombia
Flora of Ecuador
Flora of Panama
Plants described in 1932